Charles Henry Niehaus (January 24, 1855 — June 19, 1935), was an American sculptor.

Education
Niehaus was born in Cincinnati, Ohio, to German parents. He began working as a marble and wood carver, and then gained entrance to the McMicken School of Design in Cincinnati. He studied at the Royal Academy in Munich, Germany (1877–81). The effect of the German study was that he retained much of the Neo-Classical flavor in his art while most other sculptors of his generation were drawn towards Beaux-Arts realism.

Career
He returned to America in 1881. By virtue of being a native Ohioan, he was commissioned to sculpt two statues of the recently assassinated President Garfield; one for Cincinnati (Garfield's home city), and the other, in another pose, for the National Statuary Hall Collection at the United States Capitol. He moved to Rome, Italy, where he worked on the commissions, and made a study of ancient sculpture. He modeled three major male nudes during his years in Rome, including The Scraper (1883) and Caestus (1883-85). He returned to New York City in 1885, and opened a studio.

In 1887, he created a statue of Ohioan William Allen, also for Statuary Hall.  In later years, he was to place statues of Oliver P. Morton of Indiana (1900), John J. Ingalls of Kansas (1905), Zachariah Chandler of Michigan (1913), George W. Glick of Kansas (1914), Ephraim McDowell of Kentucky (1929), and Henry Clay of Kentucky (1929) in the collection. His work was also part of the sculpture event in the art competition at the 1932 Summer Olympics.

Monuments by Niehaus can be found in many American cities.  Several of the works authored by him are equestrian statues. As was the case with other sculptors of his day he also fashioned a fair amount of architectural sculpture.

In 1900 Niehaus married noted horticulturalist Regina Armstrong and moved to New Rochelle, New York.

A resident of Cliffside Park, New Jersey, Niehaus died at his home there on June 19, 1935.

Selected works

 James A. Garfield, Piatt Park, Cincinnati, Ohio, 1882-87.
 The Scraper (Athlete Using a Strigil), Brookgreen Gardens, Murrells Inlet, South Carolina, 1883.
 Caestus, Metropolitan Museum of Art, New York City, 1883-85.
 Bas-relief panel of Surrender of the Hessians, Trenton Battle Monument, Trenton, New Jersey, 1891–1893. William Rudolf O'Donovan sculpted the colossal George Washington statue atop the monument, and statues of two Continental soldiers flanking the entrance. Thomas Eakins modeled two other bas-relief panels.
 Moses, Main Reading Room, Library of Congress, Washington, D.C., 1894.
 Edward Gibbon, Main Reading Room, Library of Congress, Washington, D.C., 1894.
 Samuel Hahnemann Monument, Scott Circle,  Washington, D.C., 1896-1900.
 Hackley Park, Muskegon, Michigan:
Bust of Charles Hackley, 1890.
 Abraham Lincoln Monument, 1900. Replicas of Niehaus's Abraham Lincoln are at the Buffalo History Museum in Buffalo, New York, and at Library Park in Kenosha, Wisconsin.
 David Farragut Monument, 1900.
 William McKinley Monument, 1902.
 Bust of Robert Blum, Cincinnati Art Museum, Cincinnati, Ohio, ca. 1900.
 The Driller, Edwin Drake Memorial, Woodlawn Cemetery, Titusville, Pennsylvania, 1901.
 Equestrian Statue of General Forrest, Nathan Bedford Forrest Grave, Forrest Park, Memphis, Tennessee, 1901-05.
 Apotheosis of St. Louis, Forest Park, St. Louis, Missouri,  1906.
 William McKinley, McKinley Memorial Mausoleum, Canton, Ohio, 1907. Niehaus also modeled the lunette bas-relief over the entrance.
 Benjamin Harrison, Indiana World War Memorial Plaza, Indianapolis, Indiana, 1908.
 James W. Beardsley, Beardsley Park, Bridgeport, Connecticut, 1909.
 John Paul Jones, John Paul Jones Memorial, West Potomac Park, Washington, D.C., 1912. Niehaus's plaster original is at the United States Naval Academy, Annapolis, Maryland.
  Oliver Hazard Perry (1915–16), Front Park, Buffalo, New York.
 Orpheus with the Awkward Foot (Francis Scott Key Monument), Fort McHenry National Monument, Baltimore, Maryland, 1916-22.
 Planting the Standard of Democracy in Honor of Newark's Soldiers, World War I Memorial, Lincoln Park, Newark, New Jersey, 1923.
 Hackensack War Monument, The Green, Bergen County Court House, Hackensack, New Jersey, 1924.
 At least 30 Civil War monuments and several World War I memorials.

United States Capitol

Niehaus had eight statues in the National Statuary Hall Collection at the United States Capitol in Washington, D.C., a record for a sculptor. However, in 2003, Kansas replaced his statue of George Washington Glick with one of Dwight D. Eisenhower, and in 2011, Michigan replaced his Zachariah Chandler statue with one of Gerald R. Ford. His remaining six statues are still more than any other sculptor has in the Hall.
James A. Garfield, 1886.
William Allen, 1887.
Oliver P. Morton, 1900.
John James Ingalls, 1905.
Zachariah Chandler, 1913 (removed 2011).
George W. Glick, 1914 (removed 2003).
Henry Clay, 1929.
Ephraim McDowell, 1929.

There are also two busts by Niehaus in other collections:
 Bust of James A. Garfield, United States Senate Art Collection, ca. 1885.
 Bust of Daniel D. Tompkins, United States Senate Vice Presidential Bust Collection, 1891.

Architectural sculpture

 Connecticut State Capitol, Hartford, Connecticut:
Bust of Joel Barlow, ca. 1885.
Bust of George Berkeley, ca. 1885.
Statue of John Davenport, 1889.
Statue of Thomas Hooker, 1889.
Bust of Reverend Jonathan Edwards, 1895.
Bust of John Trumbull, 1895.
Bas-relief of Hooker's March, 1895.
Bas-relief of Davenport Preaching at New Haven, 1895.
 Astor Memorial Doors (south doors), Trinity Church, New York City, 1895.
 Two tympana, Thomas Jefferson Building, Library of Congress, Washington, D.C., ca. 1896.
 Pedimental sculpture of The Triumph of Law, Appellate Court House, New York City, 1896–1900.
 Pedimental sculpture, Kentucky State Capitol, Frankfort, Kentucky, 1907.

Gallery

Notes

References
 Bzdak, Meredith Arms, photographs by Douglas Peterson, Public Sculpture in New Jersey: Monuments to Collective identity, Rutgers University Press, New Brunswick, New Jersey,  1999
 
 Connecticut State Capitol Statuary, The League of Women Voters of Connenticut: Education Fund
 Hardin Campen, Richard N., Outdoor Sculpture in Ohio: A Comprehensive Overview of Outdoor Sculpture in Ohio, Mid-Nineteenth Century to the Present, West Summit Press, Chagrin Falls, Ohio,  1980
 Kvaran, Einar Einarsson, Architectural Sculpture of America, unpublished manuscript
 Opitz, Glenn B, Editor, Mantle Fielding's Dictionary of American Painters, Sculptors & Engravers,  Apollo Book, Poughkeepsie NY, 1986
 Proske, Beatrice Gilman, Brookgreen Gardens Sculpture'', Brookgreen Gardens, South Carolina, 1968

External links

 

1855 births
1935 deaths
Artists from Cincinnati
People from Cliffside Park, New Jersey
Artists from New Rochelle, New York
American people of German descent
Art Academy of Cincinnati alumni
Academy of Fine Arts, Munich alumni
20th-century American sculptors
20th-century American male artists
19th-century American sculptors
American male sculptors
Neoclassical sculptors
National Sculpture Society members
Sculptors from New York (state)
Sculptors from Ohio
19th-century American male artists
Olympic competitors in art competitions